André Dussollier (born 17 February 1946) is a French actor.

Selected filmography

Awards and nominations

César Awards

Lumières Award

Molière Awards

References

External links

 

1946 births
Living people
People from Annecy
French male film actors
French male television actors
French male stage actors
20th-century French male actors
21st-century French male actors
French National Academy of Dramatic Arts alumni
Best Actor César Award winners
Best Supporting Actor César Award winners
Magritte Award winners